Pak Tin Pa is a village in Tsuen Wan District, Hong Kong.

Administration
Pak Tin Pa is a recognized village under the New Territories Small House Policy.

References

External links
 Delineation of area of existing village Pak Tin Pa (Tsuen Wan) for election of resident representative (2019 to 2022)

Villages in Tsuen Wan District, Hong Kong